Georgii Zantaraia (born 21 October 1987) is a Georgian-born Ukrainian judoka.

Zantaraia is a candidate for the Kyiv City Council of the party Servant of the People in the 2020 Kyiv local election set for 25 October 2020.

Career
Zantaraia became World Champion in the −60 kg division at the 2009 World Judo Championships in Rotterdam. That same year he won the silver medal at the 2009 European Judo Championships in Tbilisi, being beaten by Arsen Galstyan in the final.

In 2010 Zantaraia won the silver medal at the 2010 World Judo Championships in  Tokyo, unable to defend his title against Rishod Sobirov who would retain his title in 2011, while Zantaraia claimed the bronze that year in Paris. Zantaraia would however win his first European title at the 2011 European Judo Championships in Istanbul beating Betkil Shukvani in the final. In 2013 Zantaraia won another bronze medal at the 2013 World Judo Championships in Rio de Janeiro.

He competed in the men's 66 kg event at the 2020 Summer Olympics in Tokyo, Japan.

References

External links

 
 
 

1987 births
Living people
People from Gali (town)
Ukrainian male judoka
Judoka at the 2012 Summer Olympics
Judoka at the 2016 Summer Olympics
Judoka at the 2020 Summer Olympics
Olympic judoka of Ukraine
Judoka at the 2015 European Games
Judoka at the 2019 European Games
European Games medalists in judo
European Games gold medalists for Ukraine
European Games bronze medalists for Ukraine
Ukrainian people of Georgian descent
World judo champions
Servant of the People (political party) politicians
Ukrainian sportsperson-politicians